The 2021 Barangay Ginebra San Miguel season was the 42nd season of the franchise in the Philippine Basketball Association (PBA).

Key dates
March 14: The PBA Season 46 draft was held at the TV5 Media Center in Mandaluyong.

Draft picks

Roster

 

 

 

  Also serves as Barangay Ginebra's board governor.

Philippine Cup

Eliminations

Standings

Game log

|-bgcolor=ffcccc
| 1
| July 18
| NLEX
| L 75–94
| Japeth Aguilar (15)
| Scottie Thompson (12)
| Scottie Thompson (9)
| Ynares Sports Arena
| 0–1
|-bgcolor=ccffcc
| 2
| July 23
| Blackwater
| W 96–81
| Stanley Pringle (19)
| Christian Standhardinger (19)
| LA Tenorio (7)
| Ynares Sports Arena
| 1–1
|-bgcolor=ffcccc
| 3
| July 25
| Magnolia
| L 79–89
| Stanley Pringle (22)
| Scottie Thompson (12)
| Stanley Pringle (6)
| Ynares Sports Arena
| 1–2
|-bgcolor=ccffcc
| 4
| July 30
| NorthPort
| W 87–85
| Stanley Pringle (24)
| Christian Standhardinger (12)
| LA Tenorio (7)
| Ynares Sports Arena
| 2–2

|-bgcolor=ffcccc
| 5
| September 3
| Terrafirma
| L 90–95
| Christian Standhardinger (17)
| Mariano, Standhardinger (8)
| Scottie Thompson (6)
| DHVSU Gym
| 2–3
|-bgcolor=ccffcc
| 6
| September 8
| Rain or Shine
| W 83–77
| Christian Standhardinger (16)
| Japeth Aguilar (11)
| Scottie Thompson (6)
| DHVSU Gym
| 3–3
|-bgcolor=ffcccc
| 7
| September 10
| San Miguel
| L 102–111
| LA Tenorio (19)
| Aguilar, Thompson (8)
| LA Tenorio (11)
| DHVSU Gym
| 3–4
|-bgcolor=ffcccc
| 8
| September 12
| TNT
| L 67–88
| Japeth Aguilar (18)
| Christian Standhardinger (9)
| Pringle, Tenorio (5)
| DHVSU Gym
| 3–5
|-bgcolor=ccffcc
| 9
| September 15
| Phoenix
| W 94–87
| Stanley Pringle (31)
| Christian Standhardinger (12)
| LA Tenorio (5)
| DHVSU Gym
| 4–5
|-bgcolor=ffcccc
| 10
| September 17
| Alaska
| L 75–89
| Stanley Pringle (20)
| Scottie Thompson (12)
| Mariano, Pringle (4)
| DHVSU Gym
| 4–6
|-bgcolor=ffcccc
| 11
| September 23
| Meralco
| L 66–79
| Stanley Pringle (19)
| Christian Standhardinger (14)
| Christian Standhardinger (4)
| DHVSU Gym
| 4–7

Playoffs

Bracket

Game log

|-bgcolor=ccffcc
| 1
| September 25
| Phoenix
| W 95–85
| Prince Caperal (19)
| Christian Standhardinger (12)
| Pringle, Tenorio (4)
| DHVSU Gym
| 1–0

|-bgcolor=ffcccc
| 1
| September 29
| TNT
| L 71–84
| Christian Standhardinger (17)
| Christian Standhardinger (19)
| Caperal, Pringle, Tenorio (3)
| DHVSU Gym
| 0–1

Governors' Cup

Eliminations

Standings

Game log

|-bgcolor=ccffcc
| 1
| December 12
| Alaska
| W 80–77
| Justin Brownlee (28)
| Justin Brownlee (10)
| Justin Brownlee|Brownlee, Standhardinger (4)
| Ynares Sports Arena
| 1–0
|-bgcolor=ccffcc
| 2
| December 17
| NorthPort
| W 108–82
| Justin Brownlee (28)
| Justin Brownlee (9)
| Standhardinger, Thompson (8)
| Smart Araneta Coliseum
| 2–0
|-bgcolor=ccffcc
| 3
| December 19
| Phoenix
| W 125–121 (OT)
| Justin Brownlee (31)
| Japeth Aguilar (11)
| LA Tenorio (9)
| Smart Araneta Coliseum
| 3–0
|-bgcolor=ffcccc
| 4
| December 25
| Magnolia
| L 94–117
| Justin Brownlee (21)
| Justin Brownlee (12)
| Tenorio, Thompson (5)
| Smart Araneta Coliseum4,843
| 3–1

|-bgcolor=ffcccc
| 5
| February 13, 2022
| Meralco
| L 95–101
| Justin Brownlee (27)
| Justin Brownlee (14)
| John Pinto (9)
| Smart Araneta Coliseum
| 3–2
|-bgcolor=ffcccc
| 6
| February 18, 2022
| TNT
| L 92–119
| Justin Brownlee (25)
| Justin Brownlee (9)
| Scottie Thompson (7)
| Smart Araneta Coliseum
| 3–3
|-bgcolor=ffcccc
| 7
| February 20, 2022
| San Miguel
| L 102–110
| Justin Brownlee (40)
| Christian Standhardinger (17)
| Christian Standhardinger (8)
| Smart Araneta Coliseum3,347
| 3–4
|-bgcolor=ccffcc
| 8
| February 25, 2022
| Blackwater
| W 109–100
| Justin Brownlee (25)
| Scottie Thompson (9)
| LA Tenorio (9)
| Ynares Center
| 4–4
|-bgcolor=ccffcc
| 9
| February 27, 2022
| Terrafirma
| W 112–107
| Justin Brownlee (29)
| Justin Brownlee (15)
| Scottie Thompson (11)
| Ynares Center3,561
| 5–4

|-bgcolor=ffcccc
| 10
| March 4, 2022
| NLEX
| L 103–115
| Justin Brownlee (36)
| Scottie Thompson (17)
| Justin Brownlee (11)
| Smart Araneta Coliseum
| 5–5
|-bgcolor=ccffcc
| 11
| March 6, 2022
| Rain or Shine
| W 104–93
| Justin Brownlee (25)
| Scottie Thompson (12)
| LA Tenorio (8)
| Smart Araneta Coliseum6,502
| 6–5

Playoffs

Bracket

Game log

|-bgcolor=ccffcc
| 1
| March 16, 2022
| TNT
| W 104–92
| Justin Brownlee (38)
| Scottie Thompson (15)
| Scottie Thompson (8)
| Smart Araneta Coliseum7,091
| 1–0
|-bgcolor=ccffcc
| 2
| March 19, 2022
| TNT
| W 115–95
| Justin Brownlee (29)
| Justin Brownlee (18)
| Scottie Thompson (9)
| Smart Araneta Coliseum10,486
| 2–0

|-bgcolor=ccffcc
| 1
| March 23, 2022
| NLEX
| W 95–86
| Justin Brownlee (27)
| Justin Brownlee (14)
| Brownlee, Tenorio (6)
| SM Mall of Asia Arena
| 1–0
|-bgcolor=ccffcc
| 2
| March 25, 2022
| NLEX
| W 104–94
| Justin Brownlee (32)
| Scottie Thompson (12)
| LA Tenorio (7)
| SM Mall of Asia Arena
| 2–0
|-bgcolor=ffcccc
| 3
| March 27, 2022
| NLEX
| L 85–86
| Justin Brownlee (27)
| Christian Standhardinger (16)
| LA Tenorio (9)
| SM Mall of Asia Arena13,272
| 2–1
|-bgcolor=ccffcc
| 4
| March 30, 2022
| NLEX
| W 112–93
| Justin Brownlee (47)
| Christian Standhardinger (11)
| Christian Standhardinger (7)
| Smart Araneta Coliseum10,353
| 3–1

|-bgcolor=ffcccc
| 1
| April 6, 2022
| Meralco
| L 91–104
| Justin Brownlee (27)
| Christian Standhardinger (14)
| Scottie Thompson (10)
| Smart Araneta Coliseum12,457
| 0–1
|-bgcolor=ccffcc
| 2
| April 8, 2022
| Meralco
| W 99–93
| Justin Brownlee (36)
| Justin Brownlee (13)
| Justin Brownlee (9)
| SM Mall of Asia Arena12,248 
| 1–1
|-bgcolor=ffcccc
| 3
| April 10, 2022
| Meralco
| L 74–83
| Justin Brownlee (19)
| Justin Brownlee (15)
| Justin Brownlee (7)
| SM Mall of Asia Arena16,104
| 1–2
|-bgcolor=ccffcc
| 4
| April 13, 2022
| Meralco
| W 95–84
| Brownlee, Thompson (27)
| Justin Brownlee (18)
| Justin Brownlee (7)
| Smart Araneta Coliseum17,298 
| 2–2
|-bgcolor=ccffcc
| 5
| April 17, 2022
| Meralco
| W 115–110
| Justin Brownlee (40)
| Justin Brownlee (11)
| Scottie Thompson (11)
| Smart Araneta Coliseum18,251
| 3–2
|-bgcolor=ccffcc
| 6
| April 22, 2022
| Meralco
| W 103–92
| LA Tenorio (30)
| Justin Brownlee (16)
| Justin Brownlee (6)
| SM Mall of Asia Arena20,224 
| 4–2

Transactions

Free agency

Signings

Rookie signings

Trades

Pre-season

Mid-season

Recruited imports

Awards

References

Barangay Ginebra San Miguel seasons
Barangay Ginebra San Miguel